The ninth and final season of the Fairy Tail anime series was directed by Shinji Ishihira and produced by A-1 Pictures, CloverWorks, and Bridge. Like the rest of the series, it follows the adventures of  Natsu Dragneel and Lucy Heartfilia of the fictional guild Fairy Tail.

On July 20, 2017, Hiro Mashima announced on Twitter that a third and "final" series of Fairy Tail would air in 2018. The final season premiered on October 7, 2018 on TV Tokyo, and is simultaneously released by Funimation with a broadcast dub in North America.

The anime contains eight pieces of theme music: four opening themes and four ending themes. For episodes 278 to 290, the first opening theme is "Power of the Dream", performed by lol, and the ending theme is "Endless Harmony", performed by Beverly. For episodes 291 to 303, the second opening and ending themes are "Down by Law" by The Rampage from Exile Tribe and "Pierce" by EMPiRE, respectively. For episodes 304 to 315, the third opening and ending themes are "No-Limit" by Ōsaka ☆ Shunkashūtō and "Boku to Kimi no Lullaby" by Miyuna. The fourth opening and ending themes, used for the remainder of the season, are "More Than Like" by BiSH and "Exceed" by Miyuu. "Snow Fairy", performed by Funkist, is used in episode 328 as an insert song.



Episode list

Notes

References

External links
Official anime website

9
2018 Japanese television seasons
2019 Japanese television seasons